Samuel Gardiner Wright (November 18, 1781 – July 30, 1845) was an American politician who served as a member of the United States House of Representatives for  from March to July of 1845.

Early life 
Wright was born in Wrightstown, New Jersey.

Career 
In 1830, Wright was elected to the New Jersey Legislative Council representing Monmouth County. He was elected as a Whig to the Twenty-ninth United States Congress to represent  and served from March 4, 1845 until July of the same year.

Personal life 
Wright died near Imlaystown, New Jersey. He is buried in the East Branch Cemetery, near Imlaystown. Wright's daughter, Anna Marie Wright, married George Franklin Fort in 1830. Fort was elected governor of New Jersey in 1851.

See also 
 List of United States Congress members who died in office (1790–1899)

References

External links
Finding aid for the Wright Family papers at Hagley Museum and Library

1781 births
1845 deaths
Members of the New Jersey Legislative Council
People from Upper Freehold Township, New Jersey
People from Burlington County, New Jersey
Whig Party members of the United States House of Representatives from New Jersey
19th-century American politicians